William Edwin Markham (October 9, 1922 – April 5, 2021) was an American politician who was a member of the Oregon House of Representatives. He served from 1969 to 1999 as a Republican. Markham was a small business owner in the construction, timber and logging industry. He held a business degree from the University of Washington. He died at the age of 98 in 2021.

References

1922 births
2021 deaths
Republican Party members of the Oregon House of Representatives
People from Chehalis, Washington
Politicians from Roseburg, Oregon
University of Washington Foster School of Business alumni
Businesspeople from Oregon